is a multi-purpose indoor arena in the city of  Kanazawa, Japan. The capacity of the arena is 5,000 and was opened in March 2008.

External links
 Official site of Ishikawa Sports Center 

Indoor arenas in Japan
Sports venues in Ishikawa Prefecture
Buildings and structures in Kanazawa, Ishikawa
2008 establishments in Japan
Sports venues completed in 2008